Karsten Kroon (born 29 January 1976) is a Dutch former professional road bicycle racer who most recently rode for , a UCI ProTeam. He retired at the end of the 2014 season.

Career 
Born in Dalen, Kroon showed his talent as an amateur by winning the professional Ronde van Drenthe in 1996. He joined the  youth squad in 1997 and won a number of amateur races in two years. In 1999, he moved to the senior squad. His few wins included stage 8, on Bastille Day, of the 2002 Tour de France. Kroon and his teammate, Erik Dekker, finished in a seven-man group, and Kroon won a stage in his first Tour de France with the help of the more experienced Dekker. Kroon led the mountains classification in each of the three Grand Tours, though his lead did not last to the end.

On 10 August 2005 he said that, until 2007, he was to ride for Saxo Bank. He wanted more freedom. "I've never said that I want to be leader," he told Cyclingnews.com, "I only want to get chances". In March and April 2006, he was joint team captain in ProTour races. He finished in the top ten of Tirreno–Adriatico and the Tour of Flanders. He helped Fränk Schleck win the Amstel Gold Race by disrupting the chase when Schleck attacked; Kroon finished fourth. Kroon finally finished on the podium, in La Flèche Wallonne, third in front of Schleck. He also came second in the 2009 Amstel Gold Race, just behind Serguei Ivanov.

Doping
On 24 April 2018, it was reported that Kroon had confessed to doping for "a short period during my career". He added: "I was a professional cyclist in a very difficult time and I have a lot of respect for my colleagues who resisted the temptation to use doping."

Major results

1996
 1st Ronde van Drenthe
1997
 1st Vlaamse Pijl
 1st Stage 2 Circuit Franco-Belge
1998
 1st Overall Ster der Beloften
1st Stage 2
 Vuelta a Navarra
1st Stages 2 & 3
 1st Stage 6 Circuit des Mines
 1st Stage 2 Vuelta a León
1999
 10th Clásica de Almería
2000
 4th DAB Classic
 7th Dwars door Gendringen
 Held  Mountain jersey for 13 days Giro d'Italia
2001
 1st Grand Prix of Aargau Canton
 3rd Sparkassen Giro Bochum
 9th Brabantse Pijl
 Held  King of the Mountains jersey, Vuelta a España
2002
 1st Stage 8 Tour de France
2003
 1st Stage 5 Tour du Poitou-Charentes
2004
 1st Rund um den Henninger Turm
2005
 5th Brabantse Pijl
 9th Omloop Het Volk
 Held  King of the Mountains Jersey for Stage 6, Tour de France
2006
 3-Länder-Tour
1st Stages 2 & 5
 3rd La Flèche Wallonne
 4th Amstel Gold Race
 8th Tour of Flanders
2007
 4th Tour of Flanders
2008
 1st Stage 2 Vuelta a Castilla y León
 1st Stage 5 Sachsen-Tour
 1st Rund um den Henninger Turm
 5th Giro di Lombardia
 9th Amstel Gold Race
2009
 2nd Amstel Gold Race
 2nd Rund um den Henninger Turm
 4th Kuurne–Brussels–Kuurne
 5th Brabantse Pijl
2010
 1st RaboRonde Heerlen
 9th Amstel Gold Race
2012
 5th Overall Tour de l'Eurometropole

Grand Tour general classification results timeline

See also
 List of Dutch Olympic cyclists

Notes

External links 

KarstenKroon.com (fansite)
Team CSC profile

1976 births
Living people
Cyclists at the 2004 Summer Olympics
Cyclists at the 2008 Summer Olympics
Dutch male cyclists
Dutch Tour de France stage winners
Olympic cyclists of the Netherlands
People from Coevorden
UCI Road World Championships cyclists for the Netherlands
Cyclists from Drenthe